Alistair Macdonald "Zal" Cleminson (born 4 May 1949) is a Scottish guitarist, best known for his role in The Sensational Alex Harvey Band between 1972 and 1978. In 2017, he put together a new rock band - /sin'dogs/, which recorded and released a 4-song CD and toured Scotland and England at the end of the year.

Career 
A self-taught guitarist, at the start of the 1970s he played and recorded with the Glasgow-based band Tear Gas. The musicians in that band then provided the backing for Alex Harvey in The Sensational Alex Harvey Band (SAHB). Cleminson was an extremely distinctive stage presence with SAHB owing to his white-face mime makeup. He started wearing the mime makeup when the band started playing larger venues, so they could see what he was doing on stage easier. Cleminson has said "The mime face came about with bigger gigs – more people could see what I was up to".

When SAHB split up, in 1978, they decided to tour as the Zal Band, recruited The Tubes' vocalist Leroi Jones and 19-year-old Billy Rankin on guitar, who later played with Nazareth. In 1979 Cleminson joined Nazareth and recorded two albums with them, 1979's No Mean City and 1980's Malice in Wonderland. He also worked with Tandoori Cassette, who toured (several live recordings exist) and released a single; no album was released. He was a regular guitarist with singer Elkie Brooks on many of her tours throughout the 1980s. He wrote and played on Brooks' album Minutes as well as one track on No More the Fool. Cleminson has also toured  with Midge Ure on his Gift World Tour 1985 and Bonnie Tyler.

During the 1990s Cleminson played with The Party Boys, a casual band that, at various times, featured former Marillion vocalist Fish and Nazareth's Dan McCafferty and Billy Rankin as vocalists. This band became a reformed SAHB (Sensational Alex Harvey Band), in 1993, with Zero Zero vocalist Stevie Doherty; it recorded a live album titled Live in Glasgow 93.

In 2004, SAHB reunited alongside The Shamen frontman Max Maxwell and performed various tours and festivals between 2004 and 2008, releasing their first album since 1978's Rock Drill which was entitled Zalvation: Live in the 21st Century.

As well as performing with SAHB, Cleminson was a member of the now-disbanded outfits Ze Suicide and Oskura.

In 2006, he appeared in his début acting role as Wilson in the western film A Shot in the West, for which he wrote the theme music. In early 2008, he announced his retirement from the music industry and stated he would never perform live again.

Cleminson also spent a few years living in Cyprus with partner Rachel, and it was there that he had a vision to begin writing new material which would become his latest and potentially his 'final' music project. Cleminson decided to come out of retirement in 2017 and form his own band /sin'dogs/, with keyboardist David Cowan as he approached him to co-write and collaborate on early demos of what is now their debut album titled 'Vol.1'.

Cleminson knew David Cowan from performing with SAHB tribute 'The Sensational Alex Harvey Experience' and was also a personal friend of legendary SAHB drummer Ted McKenna, and who has also worked with SAHB bassist Chris Glen with his band The Outfit in 2013 before leaving in 2016 and joining up with Zal for Sin Dogs.

The majority of the musicians in Sin Dogs were actually part of The Sensational Alex Harvey Experience.  These members were William McGonagle on guitar and Nelson McFarlane on Bass.  The original drummer was Scott Cowie who had also worked with The Complete Stone Roses, and Sandi Thom to name a few.

In 2018, Scott left the band and the band brought in Louis Malvessi for a short spell before he was replaced by Carlos Marin who would be the band's final drummer .

The band performed their first UK tour at the end of 2017 and this was followed by an extensive UK tour in 2018, a studio album titled 'VOL.1' and then appearances in some major festivals which included Cropredy Sweden Rock, A New Day, and others.

In October 2019, Cleminson announced on Facebook that he would no longer be performing with Sin Dogs for reasons unknown while in the studio recording their now unreleased EP 'MUTATIS'.

Mutatis was going to feature reworkings of two classic SAHB tracks 'Isobel Goudie', and 'Faith Healer' as well as 3 brand new original tracks, but Zal decided to call quits on Sin Dogs and form a new project 'Orphans Of The Ash' which ultimately didn't get off the ground.  Orphans Of The Ash was the original title for the Sin Dogs second studio album which would have been released sometime in 2020.

Since the demise of the band, David has formed his own yet to be named project with top musicians alongside Nelson on Bass, Carlos has become a gun for hire after a short spell with rockers 'Gin Annie', and William's projects are currently unknown.

Zal has since retired once again from the music industry and will be releasing a novel sometime in 2020/2021.

Cleminson is referenced in the novel The Sacred Art of Stealing, by the Scottish author Christopher Brookmyre, as the basis of the disguises worn by bank robbers during a heist, and inspired the name of the character Zal Innez.

Guthrie Govan has cited Cleminson as one of his most important influences and considers him to have been "his Jimmy Page" in his early guitar development.

The album 'Ellipsis' by Orphans of the Ash, Zal's collaboration with Billy McGonagle from /sin'dogs/, was released on 29 November 2022.

References

External links 
Interview in Guitar Player (May 2006)

1949 births
Living people
Musicians from Glasgow
Scottish rock guitarists
Scottish heavy metal guitarists
Scottish male guitarists
Nazareth (band) members
Scottish rock singers
Blues rock musicians